Paolo Galimberti (Giussano, 7 July 1968) is an Italian  politician and entrepreneur.

Life
Galimberti is a member of Euronics. In 2013 he was elected senator in Italy. He is openly gay and was engaged to Alfonso Signorini.

See also
The People of Freedom
Euronics

References

External links
Official site

1968 births
Living people
People from Giussano
Forza Italia politicians
The People of Freedom politicians
Forza Italia (2013) politicians
Senators of Legislature XVII of Italy
Gay politicians
LGBT legislators in Italy